Football is one of the most popular sports in Kolkata, West Bengal. East Bengal, ATK Mohun Bagan and Mohammedan are the heart of Kolkata football. The rivalry between Mohun Bagan and East Bengal is one of the fiercest in the world and is considered one of flagship events in the Indian footballing calendar. Kolkata is known to be the Mecca of Indian football with the two most supported teams in the country being based within the city – ATK Mohun Bagan and East Bengal. Both teams used to play against each other in the Kolkata derby. The city is also home to the biggest stadium in India, the Vivekananda Yuba Bharati Krirangan, which as of 2015 has a capacity of 85,000. The record attendance of 131,781 came in a match between the said two teams in the semifinal of the 1997 Federation Cup.

Footballers who have visited Kolkata

Because it is often called India's football capital, many international footballing personalities have visited Kolkata. In 1977, Mohun Bagan played a friendly match against the famous North American Soccer League club New York Cosmos, which featured Pelé. The match, which took place at Eden Gardens, had an attendance of 80,000. The match ended 2–2. Others who have visited Kolkata are Argentinean footballing legend Diego Maradona and current star Lionel Messi. German legends, including Franz Beckenbauer and Oliver Kahn, have also visited. The best goalkeeper in football history, Russian Lev Yashin, visited in 1955 and 1973. English World Cup–winning legend Bobby Moore was the chief guest during the 1984 Nehru Cup. Emeka Ezuego, the Nigerian World Cup player, played for East Bengal and Mohammedan Sporting. Majid Bishkar, the Iranian World Cup player, played for East Bengal and Mohammedan Sporting from 1980 to 1986. Cameroon footballing legend Roger Milla played for Diamond Club in some exhibition matches in the Centenary Celebration of Mohun Bagan. Uruguay football captain Diego Forlan visited Kolkata in 2010. Karl-Heinz Rummenigge visited in 2010. Julian Caminho visited Kolkata twice—first in 1988 to play for East Bengal and again in 2011. MacDonald Mukansi played for East Bengal in 2007.

Others who have also visited are Terry Paine, Carlos Alberto Torres, Enzo Francescoli, Valencia Ramos, Jorge Burruchaga, Ricardo Gareca, László Kiss, Nicky Butt, Włodzimierz Smolarek, Andrzej Buncol, Eusébio, Ronald Koeman, Paul Breitner, and Swansea City's Neil Taylor.

Footballers from West Bengal

The state of West Bengal has contributed many legends to Indian football, such as:

Chuni Goswami, first Padma Shri awardee, awarded best striker of Asia in 1962.
Gostho Pal, footballer, who was member of the Mohun Bagan team that won the IFA shield against a British team in the pre-independence period.
Krishanu Dey, footballer, known as the "Indian Maradona".
Mohammed Salim, first player from the Indian subcontinent to play overseas, in the year 1936 for the Scottish Club Celtic FC.
Pradip Kumar Banerjee, named Indian Footballer of the 20th Century by FIFA, and awardee of the FIFA Order of Merit.
Shailen Manna, footballer, the only Asian Footballer ever to be named among the 10 best Captains in the world by the English FA in 1953.
Subrata Paul, member of Indian team, first Indian goalkeeper to play professionally for a foreign club in 1st division (Danish Superliga).
Sudip Chatterjee , footballer, considered among the finest in Indian football, declared AIFF player of the decade in 1994.

International football
Robin Dutt, former manager of Bundesliga club, Werder Bremen.
Neil Taylor, Welsh footballer of half-Bengali origin.

Arjuna award winners

 P. K. Banerjee
 Chuni Goswami
 Arun Lal Ghosh
 Prasun Banerjee
 Sudhir Karmakar
 Shanti Mullick
 Subrata Bhattacharya
 Deepak Kumar Mondal
 Subrata Pal

West Bengal football team

The West Bengal football team is an Indian football team representing the state of West Bengal in the Santosh Trophy.

They have appeared in the Santosh Trophy finals 43 times, and have won the trophy 32 times, (the most by any team). Prior to 1972, the team competed as 'Bengal'.

See also
 History of Indian football

References

Further reading

Dutta, P. L., Memoir of 'Father of Indian Football' Nagendraprasad Sarbadhikary (Calcutta: N. P. Sarbadhikary Memorial Committee, 1944) (hereafter Memoir)
Ghosh, Saurindra Kumar. Krira Samrat Nagendraprasad Sarbadhikary 1869–1940 (Calcutta: N. P. Sarbadhikary Memorial Committee, 1963) (hereafter Krira Samrat).

 
Football in West Bengal